The 1952 Little All-America college football team is composed of college football players from small colleges and universities who were selected by the Associated Press (AP) as the best players at each position. For 1952, the AP followed the precedent established in 1951 by selecting three separate groups: a first team consisting of separate offensive and defensive platoons, and a second team consisting of 11 players.

First team

Offensive platoon
 Back - Don Gottlob, Sam Houston
 Back - Al Conway, William Jewell
 Back - Ralph DiMicco, Alfred
 Back - Steve Trudnak, Lenoir-Rhyne
 End - Joe Kirven, Presbyterian
 End - Tony Chambers, Massachusetts
 Tackle - Robert Lade, Peru Teachers
 Tackle - Tom Fann, Tennessee Tech
 Guard - Jodie Connell, Jacksonville Teachers
 Guard - Pete Swanson, Whitworth
 Center - Lou Bohnsack, Iowa Teachers

Defensive platoon
 End - Al Feeney, Western Reserve
 End - Charles Kuehn, McNeese
 Tackle - Lester Lagod, Chattanooga
 Tackle - Cal Roberts, Gustavus Adolphus
 Guard - Donald Bardell, Rochester
 Guard - Charles Weber, West Chester
 Linebacker - Robert Wiechard, Kings Point
 Linebacker - Ted Levenhagen, LaCrosse Teachers
 Back - Ron Billings, Pacific Lutheran
 Back - Wally Bullington, Abilene Christian
 Back - Neil Garrett, Nevada

Second team
 Back - Frank Buchiewicz, Pacific
 Back - Bruce Bigford, Lawrence
 Back - Bucky McElroy, Mississippi Southern
 Back - Jimmy Feix, Western Kentucky
 End - Jim Ladd, Bowling Green
 End - Jack Abell, Wofford
 Tackle - D.L. "Bruno" Ashley, East Texas
 Tackle - Robert Jennings, South Dakota
 Guard - Ron Hoffman, St. Lawrence
 Guard - La Vern Robbins, Midwestern (TX)
 Center - Frank Treuchert, Springfield

See also
 1952 College Football All-America Team

References

Little All-America college football team
Little All-America college football teams